This is a list of tallest buildings in Amsterdam.

Buildings

See also
List of tallest buildings in the Netherlands
List of tallest buildings in Rotterdam
List of tallest buildings in Haaglanden

Amsterdam
Tallest buildings